Singularity (stylized as SINGULARITY) is the ninth studio album released by the Japanese hip hop group Lead, released on March 18, 2020, nearly two years after their previous album, Milestone. It debuted at No. 12 on the Oricon charts, becoming their first in eight years not to debut in the top ten.

The album included their singles Be the Naked, Summer Vacation and Hide and Seek/Sunset Refrain.

Singularity was released in three separate editions; a CD only version, a 2CD edition that contained a special booklet, and a CD+DVD edition, which housed music videos for not only the videos from the singles, but the previously unreleased video for "Hide and Seek".

Information
Singularity is the ninth studio album released by the Japanese hip-hop group Lead, released two years after their previous studio album Milestone. The album debuted on the Oricon Albums Charts at No. 12, breaking their string of top ten album releases, which began in 2012 with their studio album Now or Never. By the second day, it had dropped to the No. 20 spot.

The album was released in three separate editions: a standard CD containing thirteen musical tracks; a type A CD+DVD edition, which housed music videos for all the videos from the singles, along with the previously unreleased "Hide and Seek"; and a type B 2CD edition that contained thirteen tracks on the first disc, a special radio show hosted by the group, a remix of "Summer Vacation", a live version of "Say Good-bye Say Hello" and a special booklet. All editions were also given first press limited editions, which included tickets to the group's upcoming live event, Leaders Party 17! ~Breakthrough~.

As a special promotion, when buyers pre-ordered the album at various CD shops nationwide, they could receive a clear file folder. The company also collaborated with Amazon Japan for several promotions, including a DECA jacket with the pattern of either the A or B special edition. At each venue for their fan club tour Leaders Party 17! ~Breakthrough~ (stylized as Leaders Party 17! ~BREAKTHROUGH~), which was held in April 2020, those who purchased a CD, DVD or Blu-ray received a Singularity-themed poster.

Promotional activities
Prior to the album's release, the group had released three singles: Be the Naked, Summer Vacation and Hide and Seek/Sunset Refrain.

Be the Naked was the thirtieth single released by Lead, and was their first single of 2019. It debuted in the top ten on the Oricon Singles Charts at No. 7 and climbed to the No. 6 spot by the third day. It was released in four formats: a standard CD, two CD+DVD editions, and a CD+booklet edition. The CD only version housed the title track and two coupling tracks, while the other editions carried the title track and one of two coupling tracks. Summer Vacation was their thirty-fifth single and debuted at No. 6 on the Oricon Singles Charts, becoming their fourteenth consecutive single to chart in the top ten. It came in four formats: a standard CD, two CD+DVD editions, and a CD+booklet edition. The CD only version carried three songs: the title track "Summer Vacation", and the two coupling tracks "Paradise City" and "Anthem". As with their previous single, each edition harbored the main track and one of two b-sides.

Hide and Seek/Sunset Refrain was their thirty-second single, and final single before their album Singularity. The single continued their streak of top-charting singles, and peaked at No. 3 on the Oricon Singles Charts. The single was released in four formats: a standard CD, two CD+DVD editions, and a CD+booklet edition. The standard CD housed the title tracks and the coupling track "Midnight Free Way", while the CD+DVD editions only contained the two a-sides. The CD+booklet, however, featured the two title tracks, along with their corresponding instrumentals.

As a special promotion, when buyers pre-ordered the album at various CD shops nationwide, they could receive a clear file folder. The company also collaborated with Amazon Japan where buyers would receive a DECA jacket with the pattern of either the A or B special edition cover. At each venue for their fan club tour Leaders Party 17! ~Breakthrough~, which will be held in April 2020, those who purchase a music CD or DVD/Blu-ray will receive a Singularity-themed poster.

In an effort to aid in promotion, on March 22, a live broadcast was launched on LINE LIVE, where the group talked about the album.

Track listing

Special release events
9th album "Singularity" Launch Events

 January 25, 2020: Tower Records Nagoya PARCO
 January 26, 2020: Tower Records Kobe Store
 February 1, 2020: Tower Records Sendai PARCO
 February 2, 2020: Music Plaza Indo
 February 19, 2020: Tower Records Shibuya (Autograph／Photo Session)
 February 20, 2020: Tower Records Shinjuku Store (Autograph Session)
 March 18, 2020: Tokyo -Cancelled-
 March 20, 2020: Osaka -Cancelled-
 March 21, 2020: Aichi -Cancelled-
 March 22, 2020: Tokyo -Cancelled-
 May 3, 2020: Leaders Exclusive Event (Photo Session)

Cancellations
On February 19, 2020, through Lead's official Twitter account, Pony Canyon put out a notice that several of the scheduled live events had been postponed or cancelled due to the COVID-19 pandemic. All events between March 18 and March 22 were cancelled indefinitely.

Personnel
Credits are adapted from album's liner notes
Musicians
 Keita Furuya - vocals
 Akira Kagimoto - vocals
 Shinya Tanuichi - vocals

Production
 Naotaka Yamaguchi - producer
 Shigeru Kawai - director
 Daisuke Nishizawa - director
 Hajime Kodama - vocal direction
 Yoshihiro Kinoshita - coordination
 Yukihito Sakakibara - music producer
 Takashi Kasuga - supervisor
 T. Taira - executive producer
 Takashi Tsuboi - audio and recording
 Yoko Abe - products coordinator
 Nobuaki Iijima - art direction
 Misa Tsukagoshi - design
 Susumu Miyawaki - photographer
 Yuya Murata - stylist
 Shunsuke Takata - hair and make-up

Charts

References

External links
 Lead Official

Lead (band) albums
2020 albums
Pony Canyon albums